This is a list of place name etymologies in San Francisco, California.

Place names

See also
 List of hills in San Francisco
 List of streets in San Francisco

Further reading

External links

References

San Francisco, California, street names in, etymologies of
Street names, Etymologies of
San Francisco